Marin Dragnea (born 1 January 1956) is a former Romanian footballer who played as a midfielder.

Club career
Marin Dragnea was born on 1 January 1956 in Slobozia Moară, Romania. He started playing football at the junior squads of Progresul București, starting to play at senior level in 1972 when the club was in Divizia B. He was transferred to Dinamo București where he stayed one year without playing, after which he went to play for FC Constanţa where on 29 August 1976 he made his Divizia A debut in a 0–0 against Progresul București. After one season with 6 goals scored in 30 games, Dragnea left FC Constanţa in order to return at Dinamo where from 1981 until 1984 the team won three consecutive Divizia A titles, in the first he contributed with 7 goals scored in 23 matches, in the second he played 30 games and scored 7 goals and in the third he made 29 appearances and scored 15 goals. Dragnea also won three Cupa României with the Red Dogs and appeared in 26 matches in which he scored 3 goals in European competitions, including appearing in 8 games in which he scored one goal in the 1983–84 European Cup as the club reached the semi-finals. After nine and a half seasons in which he scored 58 goals in 251 Divizia A matches for Dinamo, in the middle of the 1986–87 Divizia A season he was transferred at Flacăra Moreni where in three seasons and a half he made 109 Divizia A appearances in which he scored 21 goals and appeared in two games in the 1989–90 UEFA Cup. He ended his career by playing one season for Rapid București, making his last Divizia A appearance on 16 June 1991 in a 1–0 loss against Petrolul Ploiești. During his whole career, Marin Dragnea played 405 Divizia A matches in which he scored 85 goals and made 28 appearances in which he scored 3 goals in European competitions.

International career
Marin Dragnea played 5 games at international level for Romania, making his debut when coach Mircea Lucescu used him in a 1–1 against Spain at Euro 1984. His following game was also at Euro 1984, a 2–1 loss against West Germany. Dragnea's last three games were friendlies, a 1–1 against Israel and a 1–1 and a 0–0 against Iraq.

Honours

Player
Dinamo București
Divizia A: 1981–82, 1982–83, 1983–84
Cupa României: 1981–82, 1983–84, 1985–86

Manager
Unirea Urziceni
Divizia C: 2002–03
ACS Berceni
Liga III: 2012–13

Notes

References

External links
Romania National Team 1980–1989 – Details

1956 births
Living people
Romanian footballers
Romania international footballers
Liga I players
Liga II players
FC Progresul București players
FC Dinamo București players
CSM Flacăra Moreni players
FCV Farul Constanța players
FC Rapid București players
UEFA Euro 1984 players
Association football midfielders
Romanian football managers
FC Unirea Urziceni managers